Jalagam Venkat Rao (born April 18, 1967) is ex member of the legislative assembly representing Kothagudem (Assembly constituency). He won the 2004 elections from Sathupalli constituency and 2014 elections from Kothagudem Constituency.

Early life
He was born to 5th Chief Minister of Andhra Pradesh, Jalagam Vengala Rao in Khammam in Khammam district. He has an elder brother, Jalagam Prasada Rao, a former minister. He studied towards his BS Computer science in the USA.

Career
He was a technocrat and was running a software company in Hyderabad, VJ Info.

Political career
Jalagam Venkat Rao was a Member of the Legislative Assembly of Andhra Pradesh, representing the INC for the same constituency, Sathupalle (Assembly constituency), just as his father.

TRS
He won as MLA from Kothagudem assembly constituency in 2014 general elections, the first and the only TRS legislator from the Khammam district.

References

Telangana MLAs 2014–2018
Telangana politicians
Telangana Rashtra Samithi politicians
1968 births
Living people